Elizabeth Turner is a canoeist.

Elizabeth Turner may also refer to:

Elizabeth Swann, married name Turner, Pirates of the Caribbean character
Liz Turner, EastEnders character

See also
Mary Elizabeth Turner (1854–1907), English embroiderer